The men's marathon event at the 1970 British Commonwealth Games was held on 25 July in Edinburgh, Scotland.

Results

References

Athletics at the 1970 British Commonwealth Games
1970